Zinc finger protein 395 is a protein that in humans is encoded by the ZNF395 gene.

References

Further reading 

Molecular biology
Proteins
Proteomics